James A. Ferry Jr. (born July 9, 1967) is an American college basketball coach who is the current head coach of the UMBC Retrievers men's basketball team. He formerly served as interim head coach for the 2020–2021 season at Penn State and the head men's basketball coach at Duquesne, Long Island, Adelphi, and Plymouth State.

Playing career
Ferry played one season at NYIT before transferring to Keene State College for his final three years where he led the Owls in scoring his junior year.

Coaching career
After graduation, Ferry stayed on as an assistant coach with his alma mater for one season before joining Bentley as an assistant coach from 1991 to 1998. He'd accept his first head coaching job, a single season at Division III Plymouth State, guiding the Panthers to the 1999 Little East Conference regular season title. Ferry moved on to Division II Adelphi, where he stayed for three seasons, making three consecutive NCAA tournament appearances, including two Elite Eights. He also guided the Panthers to 30-straight wins during the 2000–01 season. In 2002, Ferry would be named the head coach at LIU Brooklyn, where he'd stay for 10 seasons, earning a pair of Northeast Conference regular season and tournament titles plus back-to-back NCAA tournament appearances in 2011 and 2012.

Ferry would accept the head coaching position at Duquesne in 2012 where he'd coach for five seasons before being fired with a 60–97 overall record. Ferry would subsequently join Pat Chambers' staff at Penn State in 2017 and was part of the program's 2018 NIT Championship squad. Following the resignation of Chambers on October 21, 2020, Ferry was named interim head coach at Penn State for the remainder of the season, putting together an 11–14 record. Ferry would not be retained by Penn State, which chose to hire Micah Shrewsberry as its permanent head coach.

On April 12, 2021, Ferry was named the head coach at UMBC, replacing Ryan Odom who departed for the head coaching position at Utah State.

Head coaching record

References

External links
 Penn State profile
 UMBC profile

1967 births
Living people
Adelphi Panthers men's basketball coaches
American men's basketball coaches
American men's basketball players
Basketball coaches from New York (state)
Basketball players from New York (state)
Bentley Falcons men's basketball coaches
College men's basketball head coaches in the United States
Duquesne Dukes men's basketball coaches
UMBC Retrievers men's basketball coaches
Keene State Owls men's basketball coaches
Keene State Owls men's basketball players
LIU Brooklyn Blackbirds men's basketball coaches
NYIT Bears men's basketball players
Penn State Nittany Lions basketball coaches
People from Elmont, New York
Plymouth State Panthers men's basketball coaches
Sportspeople from Nassau County, New York